The Tatarstan Open is a tournament for professional female tennis players played on outdoor hardcourts. The event is classified as a $25,000 ITF Women's Circuit tournament and has been held in Kazan, Russia, since 2010. It had previously been a $50,000 event.

Past finals

Singles

Doubles

External links
 Official website 
 ITF search

 
ITF Women's World Tennis Tour
Hard court tennis tournaments
Tennis tournaments in Russia
Recurring sporting events established in 2010
Sport in Kazan
2010 establishments in Russia